This page details football records in Russia.

Team records

Most championships won

Overall
 10, Spartak Moscow (1992, 1993, 1994, 1996, 1997, 1998, 1999, 2000, 2001, 2017)

Consecutives
 6, Spartak Moscow (1996–2001)

Highest points total
 72, Zenit St. Petersburg (2020), Spartak Moscow (1999).

Most seasons in Russian Premier League
 24, CSKA Moscow
 24, Lokomotiv Moscow
 24, Spartak Moscow
 23, Dynamo Moscow
 23, Krylia Sovetov Samara

Individual records

League Appearances
 489, Sergei Ignashevich

League Goalscorers
143, Oleg Veretennikov

Most successful clubs overall

Russia
Football in Russia